Fagottini  (Italian: little bundles) are a form of pasta shape. They are typically pasta shapes filled with vegetables, typically steamed carrots and green beans, ricotta, onion and olive oil. Fagottini are made by cutting sheets of pasta dough into squares, placing the filling on the square, and folding the corners to meet in a point.

See also
List of pasta

References

Types of pasta